Life with Father is an American television sitcom that ran from 1953 to 1955. It starred Leon Ames as Clarence Day Sr. and Lurene Tuttle as his wife Lavinia. It began broadcasting in color in 1954, and was the first live color TV series for network television originating in Hollywood.

It was based on the long-running Broadway play of the same name, which had been adapted into a 1947 film, based on New Yorker articles and books by Clarence Day reminiscing about his family in late-19th Century New York City.

Background

Life with Father debuted on Broadway in 1939 and ran for 3224 performances over eight years, making it the longest-running nonmusical play in Broadway history, and the longest-running play of any kind between 1947 and 1972, The Broadway production  earned $5.8 million playing to 2.1 million people, and in addition to the Broadway production it was a popular regional theater presentation. While the show was playing on Broadway, 11 touring companies performed in 214 cities, earning $5 million from audiences of 3.7 million people.

Production
The half-hour show premiered on the CBS television network on November 22, 1953. It was broadcast live from CBS Television City studios in Hollywood. The producer was Fletcher Markle, who produced the Studio One live anthology series. Katherine B. Day, widow of Clarence Day, was editorial advisor, as were Howard Lindsay and Russel Crouse, authors of the Broadway production. Ames and Tuttle were selected as the leads after 100 auditions and 30 on-camera tests, and 200 auditions were conducted to select the supporting cast. Pat Hitchcock, daughter of the director Alfred Hitchcock, appeared in the premiere as Nora, the maid; Dorothy Bernard recreated her Broadway performance as Margaret, the family cook.

Cast
Premiere episode:
 Leon Ames as Clarence Day Sr.
 Lurene Tuttle as Lavinia
 Ralph Reed as Clarence Day Jr. 
 Ronnie Keith as Whitney
 Harvey Grant as Harlan 
 Freddie Leiston as John
 Dorothy Bernard as Margaret
 Pat Hitchcock as Nora

Replacement cast:
 Steven Terrell as Clarence Day Jr.
 B.G. Norman as Whitney
 Freddy Ridgeway as Whitney
 Malcolm Cassell as John
 Marion Ross as Nora

Reception
Newsday columnist Jo Coppola harshly criticized the television adaptation, saying "Even when the industry gets its hands on superior material, the end result is rotten." She called the script "inept, implausible and routine," and said that Ames character emerges as a "rude, bumbling and arrogant man" and lacking in the original production's warmth and humor. New York Times reviewer Jack Gould called the premiere episode a "tawdry and pedestrian Hollywood farce in the worst video tradition," and described the title character as a "monstrous caricature of the original."

Mary Cremmen, the Boston Globe television columnist, observed that the Ames' first performances "exaggerated the raving, explosive aspects of the Father far more than we ever recalled seeing on stage," but that his characterization had "mellowed considerably" by the December 27, 1953 program. Gould expressed similar views in a February 1954 review, saying that the show has "retrieved itself splendidly" and praised Ames' performance, saying "there is now the warmth and characterization vital to faithful interpretation of the Clarence Day Jr. stories."

A Times review of the 1954 season premiere criticized the writing, but called the series "one of the more sensible shows about family life."

References

External links
 
 Episode guide at Classic TV Archive

1953 American television series debuts
1955 American television series endings
CBS original programming
American live television series
Television series set in the 1880s
Television shows set in New York City
Period family drama television series
Television series by CBS Studios